The R401 is a Regional Route in South Africa that connects Hofmeyr with the R61 between Cradock and Bethesdaweg.

External links
 Routes Travel Info

References

Regional Routes in the Eastern Cape